This is a list of reptiles in Costa Rica.

Lizards

Family Corytophanidae
 Genus Basiliscus (brown basilisk, common basilisk, plumed basilisk)
 Genus Corytophanes (helmeted iguana)
 Genus Laemanctus (casquehead iguana)

Family Dactyloidae
 Genus Anolis (Anolis insignis, Anolis microtus)

Family Gekkonidae
 Genus Gonatodes (yellow-headed gecko)
 Genus Hemidactylus (common house gecko)
 Genus Lepidoblepharis (Costa Rica scaly-eyed gecko)
 Genus Sphaerodactylus (yellow-tailed dwarf gecko, spotted dwarf gecko)
Genus Lepidodactylus (mourning gecko)

Family Iguanidae
 Genus Ctenosaura (black spiny-tailed iguana)
 Genus Iguana (green iguana)

Family Phyllodactylidae
 Genus Thecadactylus (turnip-tailed gecko)

Family Polychrotidae
 Genus Norops (21 species, including blue-eyed anole, Carpenter's anole, green tree anole, ground anole, lemur anole, lichen anole, many-scaled anole, pug-nosed anole, slender anole, stream anole, water anole)
 Genus Polychrus (neotropical chameleon)

Family Scincidae
 Mabuya unamarginata

Family Teiidae
 Anadia ocellata
 Holcosus quadrilineatus
 Holcosus festivus
 Ptychoglossus plicatus

Family Xantusiidae
 Lepidophyma reticulatum

Snakes

Family Anomalepididae
 Anomalepis mexicana
 Helminthophis frontalis
 Liotyphlops albirostris

Family Boidae
 Boa constrictor
 Boa imperator
 Epicrates cenchria

Family Colubridae
 Amastridium veliferum (rufous-headed snake)
 Chironius exoletus
 Clelia clelia
 Drymobius melanotropis (black forest racer)
 Drymobius margaritiferus (speckled racer)
 Enulius sclateri
 Erythrolampus mimus
 Imantodes cenchoa
 Lampropeltis triangulatum
 Leptophis ahaetulla (parrot snake)
 Liophis epinphalus
 Leptodeira septentrionalis
 Mastigodryas melanolomus
 Ninia maculata
 Scaphiodontophis venustissimus
 Senticolis triaspis (green rat snake)
 Stenorrhina degenhardtii
 Stenorrhina fremenvilli
Genus Tantilla (centipede snakes)
 Thamnophis proximus
 Xenodon rhabdocephalus

Family Elapidae
 Micrurus alleni
 Micrurus mipartitus

Family Leptotyphlopidae
 Leptotyphlops goudotii

Family Loxocemidae
 Loxocemus bicolor

Family Tropidophiidae
 Ungaliophis panamensis

Family Typhlopidae
 Typhlops costaricensis

Family Viperidae
 Atropoides nummifer
 Atropoides picadoi
 Bothriechis lateralis
 Bothriechis schlegelii
 Bothrops asper
 Porthidium nasutum
 Lachesis stenophrys Cope 1875 Nicaragua, Costa Rica, Panama
 Lachesis melanocephala Solòrzano & Cerdas 1986 southeastern Costa Rica and adjoining areas of western Panama

Turtles
 Kinosternon leucostomum
 Rhinoclemmys annulata
 Rhinoclemmys funerea
 Rhinoclemmys pulcherrima
 Trachemys emolli
 Trachemys venusta

Crocodilians

Family Crocodylidae
 American crocodile

Family Alligatoridae
 Spectacled caiman

See also
List of amphibians of Costa Rica
List of birds of Costa Rica
List of mammals of Costa Rica
List of non-marine molluscs of Costa Rica

Footnotes

Reptiles
Costa Rica
 
Costa Rica